The New York Stadium (known as the AESSEAL New York Stadium for sponsorship purposes) is a football stadium in Rotherham, South Yorkshire, England. Opened in July 2012, it is the home ground of Rotherham United. Its name was inspired by the company which previously occupied the site for nearly 150 years, which famously made red fire hydrants for New York City. It hosted several matches during the UEFA Women's Euro 2022.

History
Rotherham United announced their intention to construct a new community stadium when they moved away from Millmoor to the Don Valley Stadium in May 2008 after a dispute with the ground owner Ken Booth. In January 2010 the club purchased the former site of the Guest and Chrimes Foundry to be used for the new stadium. Outline planning permission for the stadium was granted in November 2010, and the first images were sketched shortly after.

The name of the stadium was announced as the 'New York Stadium' on 19 December 2011, chosen ahead of 'The Foundry' and 'The Waterfront Stadium'. The reason for the name is that the area of land that the stadium lies upon is called 'New York' and it was thought that it would be better to name the stadium after history and/or where the stadium is situated, like nearby stadiums Bramall Lane and Hillsborough. Also Guest and Chrimes used to make fire hydrants for New York City. Chairman Tony Stewart also hopes that the name could bring investment from New York City or further afield, as the New York Yankees chairman had recently said that he wanted to invest in an English football team.

Construction started in June 2011 and the stadium was officially opened by Prince Edward, Duke of Kent on 12 March 2012. The first game played at the stadium was a pre-season match between Rotherham and Barnsley, held on 21 July 2012. The Millers won 2–1; the first goal in the stadium was scored by Jacob Mellis of Barnsley, and David Noble scored Rotherham's first goal in their new home. The New York Stadium made its league debut on 18 August 2012, in which Rotherham beat Burton Albion 3–0,
Daniel Nardiello scoring the first competitive goal in the ground.

The naming rights to the stadium were announced as having been bought by local company AESSEAL, in a press conference on 21 November 2014. Club chairman Tony Stewart said the deal was worth six figures annually, as a result of the deal. It was also suggested as being the biggest sponsorship deal of the club's history.

Other sporting events

England Women’s National Team
On 8 April 2016, England women's national football team played a UEFA Women's Euro 2017 qualifying match versus Belgium at the stadium in front of 10,550 spectators.

The stadium has also gone on to host further England women’s team games after the success of the first game again attracting large full house crowds.

UEFA Women's Euro 2022
The stadium hosted several matches as part of the UEFA Women's Euro 2022. It was used to host Group D matches, alongside the Academy Stadium, and a quarter-final.

England Men’s Youth Team
Several of England’s youth teams have hosted fixtures at the stadium including the Under 19’s 3-0 win over Italy in 2014 to a large crowd. The stadium has also hosted the Under 20’s team as well.

Design
The stadium has a 12,000 all-seated capacity, with the option to be able to increase the stadium's capacity if needed. It cost approximately £17 million to construct.
The stadium includes The 1925 Club, a corporate hospitality suite. Local businesses such as Norton Finance and Premier Hytemp were some of the first members.

At the beginning of the 2014–15 season, a large video screen was installed in the north west corner of the stadium.

Stands

North Stand
The North Stand, known as the KCM Recycling Stand for sponsorship reasons, and often referred to as the New Tivoli, is the kop stand of the stadium. The KCM Recycling Stand holds 2,000 home fans, and has the lettering of the club's initials – RUFC – in white across it. The stand is located behind one of the goals, opposite the away end.

West Stand
The West Stand, known as the Eric Twigg Pukka Pies Stand for sponsorship reasons, is the main stand of the stadium. It features the executive 1925 Lounge, and is the stand the players walk through when entering the field of play. It holds 4,000 home fans.

East Stand
The East Stand, known as the Ben Bennett Stand, is the stadium's family stand. It holds 4,000 home fans, as well as two built-in balcony-type structures for disabled people.

South Stand
The South Stand, known as the Mears Stand, is a 2,000-seater away stand. It is located behind a goal, with the family stand to the right, the main stand to the left, and the kop directly opposite.

Records

Record attendance: 11,758 v. Sheffield United, 7 September 2013

References

External links 

 

Rotherham United F.C.
Football venues in South Yorkshire
Football venues in England
English Football League venues
Sports venues completed in 2012
Sports venues in Rotherham
2012 establishments in England
UEFA Women's Euro 2022 stadiums